María José Martínez Sánchez was the defending champion, but lost to Ekaterina Makarova in the quarterfinals.
Caroline Wozniacki won the title, defeating Kaia Kanepi in the final, 6–1, 6–0. This was the first title in 13 months for the former World No. 1 and her first of 2012.

Seeds

Draw

Finals

Top half

Bottom half

Qualifying

Seeds

Qualifiers

Draw

First qualifier

Second qualifier

Third qualifier

Fourth qualifier

External links
Main draw
Qualifying draw

2012 Singles
Korea Open - Singles